The Istanbul Commerce University Faculty of Law or ICU Law ( or İTİCÜ Hukuk) is the law school of Istanbul Commerce University offering undergraduate and graduate programs, located in Istanbul, Turkey.

The faculty was established in 2001 as one of the first law schools in Turkey. Growing since, it is the third highest scores demanding private law school nationwide after Bilkent Law and TOBB Law as of 2011.

Campus 
Offering education in Eminönü Campus for eleven years from 2001 to 2012, the faculty moved to Sütlüce Campus in 2012. Law faculty in Sütlüce Campus was built specifically for law education as having moot courts, large amphitheaters, a library contains 124.000 publishing (electronic and paper) in total.

Profile 
Pursuing the globalization and Turkey's accession to EU processes, faculty offers comprehensive International Law, International Commerce Law and European Union Law lectures, apart from the courses needed for internal law of Turkey.

Language of lectures in ICU Law is Turkish, while English is a compulsory lesson and Legal English is an elective course.

Faculty attaches great importance to moot court competition experiences. Hence, it encourages and funds its senior students to join moot court competitions such as Willem C. Vis and Philip C. Jessup in international level and Velidedeoğlu Kurgusal Duruşma Yarışması in national level.

Teaching staff 
ICU Law's teaching staff is composed of eminent law scholars in Turkey. Here's the current list of full-time staff:

 Prof. Dr. Mustafa Erdoğan
 Prof. Dr. Şükrü Yıldız
 Prof. Dr. Emin Zeytinoğlu
 Prof. Dr. Algun Çifter
 Prof. Dr. Hüseyin Hatemi
 Prof. Dr. Didem Algantürk Light
 Prof. Dr. Yücel Oğurlu
 Prof. Dr. Kayıhan İçel
 Prof. Dr. Zafer Gören
 Assoc. Prof. Ayhan Ceylan
 Assoc. Prof. Muzaffer Şeker
 Assoc. Prof. Ömer Özkan
 Asst. Prof. Arif Barış Özbilen
 Asst. Prof. Ebru Şensöz Malkoç
 Asst. Prof. Abdulkadir Akıl
 Asst. Prof. Asuman Yılmaz
 Asst. Prof. Nagehan Kırkbeşoğlu
 A. R. Zehra Badak
 A. R. Hasret Ak
 A. R. Ahmet Kalafat
 A. R. M. Buket Soygüt Arslan
 A. R. Uğur Dinç
 A. R. Muhammet Celal Kul
 A. R. İdris Kaydul
 A. R. Hüseyin Erkoç

See also
Istanbul Commerce University
Turkish universities

Notes 
A  Please see full list of teaching staff here: ICU Law teaching staff

External links 
 Official website of faculty 
 Official website of the university 
 Official website of the Istanbul Chamber of Commerce

References

Law schools in Turkey
Istanbul Commerce University
Educational institutions established in 2001
2001 establishments in Turkey